The men's tournament of Basketball at the 2011 Summer Universiade at China began on August 13 and ended on August 22.

Teams

Preliminary round

Group A

Group B

Group C

Group D

Quarterfinal round

Classification 17th–23rd place

Classification 9th–16th place

Quarterfinals

Semifinal round

Classification 21st–23rd place

Classification 17th–20th place

Classification 13th–16th place

Classification 9th–12th place

Classification 5th–8th place

Semifinals

Final round

21st place game

19th place game

17th place game

15th place game

13th place game

11th place game

9th place game

7th place game

5th place game

Bronze medal game

Gold medal game

Final standings

References 
Schedule

Basketball at the 2011 Summer Universiade